Duncan L. Niederauer CBE is an American businessman. He served as the chief executive officer of the New York Stock Exchange until September 2014.

Early life
Niederauer graduated from Colgate University with a bachelor of arts degree. He received a master in business administration from the Goizueta Business School at Emory University.

Career
Niederauer joined Goldman Sachs in 1985, and became a Partner in 2000. From 2002 to 2004, he served on the Board of Manager of Archipelago Holdings. He served on the board of directors of the Eze Castle Software since 1981 and the Depository Trust & Clearing Corporation until 2008. He has served as President and Co-chief operating officer of NYSE Euronext since April 9, 2007, and as its CEO since December 1, 2007.

Niederauer is a member of G100, a private group of chief executives from the world's largest companies, and the British-American Business Council International Advisory Committee.

In 2019 he became President of Venezia FC.

He is a founding Partner of Communitas Capital.

Philanthropy
Niederauer is a member of Partnership for New York City, the Committee Encouraging Corporate Philanthropy, the Shanghai International Financial Advisory Committee, the American Ireland Fund, the Museum of American Finance, and Fundação Dom Cabral in Brazil. He also serves on the Board of Trustees of his alma mater, Colgate University, where he gave the Commencement speech in 2013. He also serves on the Boards of Operation HOPE and the Congressional Medal of Honor Foundation.

Personal life
Niederauer is married with three children. They reside in New Jersey.

References

Living people
Year of birth missing (living people)
Colgate University alumni
Emory University alumni
American chief executives of financial services companies
Goldman Sachs people
NYSE Euronext
Presidents of the New York Stock Exchange